Shreve can refer to:

People
 Anita Shreve (1946–2018), author
 Benjamin Shreve (1908–1985), American herpetologist
 (Trader)Benjamin Shreve (?–?), American trader of Salem
 Billy Shreve (born 1967), member of the Council of Frederick County, Maryland
 Bob Shreve (1912–1990), broadcasting pioneer 
 Chasen Shreve (born 1990), American baseball player
 Forrest Shreve (1878–1950), American botanist 
 Henry Miller Shreve (1785–1851), American inventor and steamboat captain
 Israel Shreve (1739–1799), colonel during the American Revolution
 Jeff Shreve (born 1965), American sports announcer
 Larry Shreve (born 1941), professional wrestler known as Abdullah the Butcher
 Milton William Shreve (1858–1939), US Congressman from Pennsylvania
 Peg Shreve (1927–2012), American politician 
 Porter Shreve (born 1967), author, son of Susan Shreve
 R. Norris Shreve (1885-1975), chemical engineer and academician at Purdue University
 Ronald L. Shreve, Professor Emeritus at Institute of Geophysics and Planetary Physics at UCLA, know for his work on Stream order
 Richmond Shreve (1877–1946), Canadian-American architect 
 Steven E. Shreve, American mathematician 
 Susan Shreve (born 1939), novelist, mother of Porter Shreve
 Thomas Shreve (1755–1816), Canadian clergyman

Places
 Shreve, Alabama
 Shreve, Ohio

See also

 Shreve, Crump & Low, commonly called "Shreve's", a Boston luxury goods retailer
 Shreve's least gecko, a Haitian lizard named for Benjamin Shreve